Arvid Knöppel may refer to:
 Arvid Knöppel (sport shooter)
 Arvid Knöppel (sculptor)